James Arthur Thomas Jewel Marsh (4 December 1909 – 3 December 1995), known professionally as Jimmy Jewel, was an English comedian and actor whose long career in stage, radio, television and film productions, included a 32-year partnership with his cousin Ben Warriss.

Career
The son of a comedian and actor who also used the stage name Jimmy Jewel, the younger performer made his stage debut in Robinson Crusoe in Barnsley, at the age of four, worked with his father from the age of 10 and subsequently became stage manager for the family show.

When young Jimmy started his own act, his father refused to let him use his stage name 'Jimmy Jewel', so he performed as Maurice Marsh; the name was chosen because he was often seen doing Maurice Chevalier impressions. He made his first London stage appearance at the Bedford Music Hall, Camden Town in 1925.

Jewel and Warriss
Jewel and Ben Warriss were first cousins and were brought up in the same household, even being born in the same bed (a few months apart). Jewel worked as a solo act until 1934, when he formed an enduring double act with Warriss, initially at the Palace Theatre, Newcastle. They toured Australia and America, as well as appearing in the 1946 Royal Variety Performance and five pantomimes for Howard & Wyndham Ltd at the Opera House, Blackpool, Lancashire.

A major success of their partnership was the BBC radio series Up the Pole which began in October 1947. The premise of Up the Pole was that Jewel and Warriss were the proprietors of an Arctic trading post. Each episode included a musical interlude; sometimes it featured Julie Andrews, then not yet an adult. Only one episode is known to survive.

The two men were top of the bill in two London Palladium shows, Gangway (1942) and High Time (1946), and made regular television appearances in the 1950s and 1960s. The duo had the lead roles in the short-lived 1962 comedy series It's a Living.

Post-1966
After splitting from Warriss in 1966, and having done a stint working as a joiner and bricklayer, Jewel appeared in a Comedy Playhouse and two ITV Playhouse productions. He also played a murderous quick-change vaudeville artist in a 1968 episode of The Avengers. He then starred in the sitcom Nearest and Dearest with Hylda Baker as bickering brother and sister pickle factory owners Eli and Nellie Pledge from 1968 to 1973, including a film version of the series in 1972. As their characters hurled insults at each other onscreen, the insults would continue off-screen as well as the two performers disliked each other intensely.

While Nearest and Dearest was running, Jewel had a regular role in the short-lived 1969 sitcom Thicker than Water and made an appearance in the 1970 film The Man Who Had Power Over Women. Jewel then starred in the comedy series Spring and Autumn (1972–76) as retired railway worker Tommy Butler. In the early 1980s, he made appearances in the children's series Worzel Gummidge (1980) and two Play For Today episodes. In 1981 he starred in Funny Man (1981), a series about a family music hall act, written by Adele Rose and based on Jewel's father's company in the 1920s and 1930s. Also that year he performed onstage as Al Lewis in Neil Simon's The Sunshine Boys at the Churchill Theatre in Bromley, London. In 1984, Jewel played the part of a devoted green keeper in the Channel 4 comedy drama Arthur's Hallowed Ground (1984) and had a regular role in the 1986 BBC crime drama Hideaway.

In the 1990s, then in his 80s, Jewel continued to make appearances in film and television. He appeared as Cannonball Lee, the boxing-loving grandfather of the Kray twins in the 1990 film The Krays, and as Michael Palin's father in American Friends (1991). On television he appeared in the 1990 ITV play, Missing Persons (which was the pilot for the later BBC series Hetty Wainthropp Investigates), and also appeared in episodes of One Foot in the Grave (1990) and Casualty (1991). His final screen appearance was in a 1993 episode of Lovejoy.

Jewel was married to Belle Bluett with whom he had a son and an adopted daughter. In 1985 he won a Variety Club of Great Britain Special Award. Jewel died on 3 December 1995, the day before his 86th birthday, and was cremated and interred at the Golders Green Crematorium, in London.

Filmography

References

External links
 

1909 births
1995 deaths
English male comedians
English male film actors
English male television actors
Music hall performers
Male actors from Sheffield
Golders Green Crematorium
20th-century English male actors
British male comedy actors
20th-century English comedians
Comedians from Yorkshire